All Around the World is the second studio album by American boy band Mindless Behavior. It was released on March 12, 2013, by Streamline and Interscope Records. Like their previous album, this album contains the elements of pop and R&B in their music and focuses primarily on themes of love. This is also the last album to feature the members Prodigy, Roc Royal and Ray Ray.

Reception
The album rose to number 6 on the US Billboard 200, and reached at number one on the Top R&B/Hip-Hop Albums. In their first week, the album outsold the band's debut album, selling 37,000 in its first week.  The album has sold 115,000 copies in the United States as of June 2016.

Track listing

Charts

Weekly charts

Year-end charts

References

2013 albums
Mindless Behavior albums